Y2K (Athoba, 'Sex Krome Aasitechhe') is a 2000 Bengali short film from Satyajit Ray Film and Television Institute, written and directed by Chandril Bhattacharya.

Plot
Chanchal, a young Calcuttan, spends most of his time finding a suitable girl to satisfy his love interest. After being disillusioned on several occasions, he finally manages to get proximity of a beautiful girl. But no sooner had he succeeded to win the girl's attention, he becomes blind in curse of God.

Cast
 Mrinmoy Nandi as Chanchol
 Sreelekha Mitra as Neela
 Silajit Majumder as Heeru
 Gargi Roychowdhury as Leena
 Rajatabha Dutta as Bhooto
 Chirantan Dasgupta as Hiron
 Miss Jojo as Namita
 Anubrata Chakrabarty as Anubrata
 Shantanu Basu as Ani
 Debjit Nag as Bishu
 Dwijen Bondhopadhyay as God 
 Anindya Banerjee as Nirmal
 Papri Ghosh as Preeti
 Mita Banerjee as Namita's mother
 Anindya Chatterjee as Prafulla
 Kashinath Ghosh 
 Babun 
 Partha Dutta 
 Maharatna Banerjee 
 Shuvodeep Ghosh 
 Sandip Sengupta

Playback singers
 Sanchari Mukherjee
 Kasturi Mukherjee
 Jagannath Guha
 Debashish Sarkar
 Abhirup Das
 Sayandeb Mukherjee

Music
Chandrabindoo (band)

References

Indian short films
Bengali-language Indian films